This article is a list of newspapers in Guernsey.
 Guernsey Press and Star

Defunct newspapers
 La Gazette de Guernesey (1791–1936)
 The Star (1813–1951)
 The Comet (1828–1897)
 Le Bailliage (1889–1902)
 The Guernsey Evening Press (1897–1951)
 Deutsche Guernsey-Zeitung (1942–1945) – produced for German occupying troops

References
 Resources at the Priaulx Library

Guernsey
Newspapers published in Guernsey
Lists of organisations based in Guernsey